Robert Neville "Bob" Francis  (11 March 1939 – 12 November 2016) was an Egyptian-born Australian talk back radio presenter at radio station 5AA in Adelaide. His program aired between 8pm and 12 midnight on weekdays and was rated as Adelaide's most popular talk back program.

In July 2013, it was announced that Francis was to retire at the end of that year. The following month he announced that he would retire from broadcasting on 8 August 2013 after 57 years. A variety of radio, television, media, and music celebrities expressed their appreciation towards his career through taped segments being aired during his last week of broadcast.

Life and career
Francis was born in Cairo, Egypt, in 1939.

Francis hosted his own radio show on 5AA from 1985 to 2013 and was the station's longest serving employee. He completed 50 years in radio.

In 1964, at just 25 years of age, while working as a radio DJ, Francis put together a petition of 80,000 signatures which ended up persuading the Beatles to change their itinerary and visit Adelaide in their 1964 tour. He also introduced the Beatles to Adelaide from the Town Hall balcony in June that year.

Older listeners remember his long-standing on-air partnership with Andy Thorpe in the late sixties to mid-seventies on radio 5ADD.

Francis was awarded the Medal of the Order of Australia (OAM) in the 1998 Australia Day Honours for "service to the community, particularly through supporting charitable organisations which seek to help young people, and to the media in the area of talk-back radio."

Until August 2013, Francis hosted his radio program from 8 pm to midnight every weekday, commanding between 24 and 28 per cent of the evening radio audience.

Francis was made famous to the rest of Australia through the ABC TV show The Chaser's War on Everything when one member of the Chaser team rang him to question 5AA reporters as they were not at the "Subway Fresh Bread" press conference which was actually just a commercial. Because of his temper, he was a constant target for prank calls, such as one featuring on John Safran's show. These clips have appeared on the video sharing site YouTube.

In 2005, Francis was inducted into the Australian Radio Hall of fame at the Australian Commercial Radio Awards held at the Sydney Convention Centre. The award recognises outstanding lifetime achievement and contribution to the radio broadcasting industry. After receiving the award, he said: "This is one of the greatest honours I can imagine, to me like winning an Academy Award." He was also presented with a Golden Microphone from 5AA for 20 years service.

In July 2013, Francis announced that he would be retiring from radio at the end of the year after talks with 5AA management. He told the Sunday Mail, "I just decided I wasn't really enjoying coming into work each day anymore." He made his last broadcast, which included many messages from well-wishers and ended with Francis in tears, on 8 August 2013.

Francis died on 12 November 2016 at the age of 77.

Controversies
One of his most controversial acts, also believed to have been one of the most controversial acts by any Australian talk show radio host, occurred on 27 September 2005 whilst talking to an elderly female listener. Francis spoke arrogantly to her, referring to her as a "stupid old lady" and repeatedly calling her a "dickbrain". The way he spoke and treated the elderly listener made headlines, and was even featured on Media Watch two weeks later. Francis refused to say sorry over the incident, saying "I loved it. If it was taken in context, she had a go at me. She was being nasty" and that "If she rang again, I'd do the same thing".

In February 2005, 5AA were found guilty by the country's peak broadcasting regulator, regarding comments made in regard to aboriginals on Francis' program. It is unknown who made the comments or what the comments were, just that they were likely to have incited or perpetuated hatred against Aboriginal people on the basis of their race. The station issued an apology over the incident.

In October 2005, Francis was involved in a legal issue after making inflammatory comments about a senior magistrate, Gary Gumpl. live on-air while commenting on a case involving Robert John Walker who had been charged with one count of possessing child pornography. Francis described Gumpl's decision to hear a bail application as "irresponsible" and made comments such as "Am I here as a normal bloody human being, or do judges live in another world?" and "Oh, smash the judge's face in." He later issued a public apology.

Despite the apology, Francis had to appear in court over the comments and pleaded guilty to one count of bringing a judicial officer into contempt or lowering his authority. In August 2006, Francis was found guilty for the comments he made, being sentenced to jail for nine weeks and fined $20,000 on a suspended sentence on the condition that he enter an 18-month good behaviour bond.

After being found guilty, Francis and the radio station faced a defamation lawsuit from Gumpl, the magistrate who Francis' comments were directed at. He accepted an offer of "around $60,000" which was paid by 5AA. Gumpl said that incident had caused him considerable stress and hardship and he was pleased it had been finalised. After the incident, Francis was banned from drinking alcohol on air, as he occasionally took a bottle of red wine into the studio to drink while taking calls, and could have been partly responsible for his outbursts.

In 2007, Francis was involved in an accident in which he broke his leg after falling off his scooter trying to avoid a dog. The accident resulted in surgery and two rods in his legs and a pin in his knee. It was later revealed that he was drink-driving and well over the legal limit at the time of the accident. He later called himself a "bloody idiot" and said that the only reason he was drinking was because his boss offered him an ongoing contract.

On 7 June 2012, Francis was suspended for a month by 5AA following comments made about asylum seekers four days earlier. he said "Bugger the boat people, as far as I'm concerned, I hope they bloody drown on their way out here. In my opinion, they are not welcome here." Francis later verbally attacked a journalist who had reported the incident saying "Can you believe that bloody bitch in The Australian ... Some smart-arse dickhead woman ... wrote me up in the paper this morning." When asked by the paper why he had made the comments he remarked "because I felt like it" and told them to "get fucked". He was condemned by fellow 5AA presenters Keith Conlon and Amanda Blair over the incident.

References

1939 births
2016 deaths
People from Adelaide
Australian talk radio hosts
Egyptian emigrants to Australia
Recipients of the Medal of the Order of Australia
Shock jocks